Salem Valley is a basin in Catoosa County, Georgia. There is also a "valley of Salem" mentioned in the apocryphal Book of Judith.

History
Salem Valley took its name from Salem Baptist Church.

References

Geography of Catoosa County, Georgia
Valleys of Georgia (U.S. state)